Nguyễn Quyễn (born 21 October 1952) is a Vietnamese long-distance runner. He competed in the marathon at the 1980 Summer Olympics.

References

External links
 

1952 births
Living people
Athletes (track and field) at the 1980 Summer Olympics
Vietnamese male long-distance runners
Vietnamese male marathon runners
Olympic athletes of Vietnam
Place of birth missing (living people)